The Mayor of Biella is an elected politician who, along with the Biella's City Council, is accountable for the strategic government of Biella in Piedmont, Italy. The current Mayor is Claudio Corradino, a member of the right-wing populist party Lega Nord, who took office on 14 June 2019.

Overview
According to the Italian Constitution, the Mayor of Biella is member of the City Council.

The Mayor is elected by the population of Biella, who also elects the members of the City Council, controlling the Mayor's policy guidelines and is able to enforce his resignation by a motion of no confidence. The Mayor is entitled to appoint and release the members of his government.

Since 1994 the Mayor is elected directly by Biella's electorate: in all mayoral elections in Italy in cities with a population higher than 15,000 the voters express a direct choice for the mayor or an indirect choice voting for the party of the candidate's coalition. If no candidate receives at least 50% of votes, the top two candidates go to a second round after two weeks. The election of the City Council is based on a direct choice for the candidate with a preference vote: the candidate with the majority of the preferences is elected. The number of the seats for each party is determined proportionally.

Italian Republic (since 1946)

City Council election (1946-1995)
From 1946 to 1995, the Mayor of Biella was elected by the city's Council.

Direct election (since 1995)
Since 1995, under provisions of new local administration law, the Mayor of Biella is chosen by direct election.

References

Biella
 
Politics of Piedmont
Biella